was an Empress consort of Japan. The youngest daughter of Kampaku Fujiwara no Mototsune, she was the wife of Emperor Daigo and the mother of emperor Suzaku and Murakami.

Life
Onshi shared her name with her elder sister, Fujiwara no Onshii (882 – 907), who was the wife of Emperor Uda of Japan and the adoptive mother of Emperor Daigo.

In 930, her spouse, the retired Emperor Daigo, as well as her father-in-law, the retired Emperor Uda, died, leaving Fujiwara no Onshi in a very influential position as the mother of the young Emperor Suzaku as well as the Crown Prince Murakami.  This position allowed her to become the Head of the Imperial Family, and she institutionalized the role of the Emperor's mother and her office as synonymous with the caretaker of a child emperor.

She continued to live with Emperor Suzaku after he became an adult and married, retaining her influence.  During the reign of her next son, Emperor Murakami, she maintained peace within the Imperial House by acting as a mediator between her sons, the emperor and the retired emperor.  In 950, she secured the appointment of prince Noriki as crown prince.

Notes

Fujiwara clan
Japanese empresses
885 births
954 deaths